Lantoto National Park is a protected area in Central Equatoria, South Sudan.

The park was named by the Sudan's central government in the Wildlife Act of 1986 and Wildlife Conservation and National Parks Act of 2003. As of 2012 the boundaries of the park have not been demarcated.

The vegetation of the park supports a huge population of elephants, Buffaloes, Baboon, Antelope and Ostrich.

The highest and the most prominent mountain is Jabal Mbang i.

Poaching in the park is increasingly threatening the survival of elephants.

References

Central Equatoria
National parks of South Sudan
Northern Congolian forest–savanna mosaic